Mitchell Dell "Mitch" Sprengelmeyer (born January 9, 1975) is a former professional tennis player from the United States.

Career
Sprengelmeyer, a three time All-American, played collegiate tennis for Clemson University from 1994 to 1997. In 1997, Sprengelmeyer was the NCAA ITA Senior Player of the Year and also won the Van Nostrand Memorial Award, the first person to win both in the same year.  Sprengelmeyer was also named ACC Player of the Year in 1997. 

Sprengelmeyer competed in the men's doubles at seven Grand Slam tournaments, winning a Grand Slam match at the 2001 French Open, with Aleksandar Kitinov. They defeated Jan Siemerink and Grant Stafford, then lost in the second round to Max Mirnyi and David Prinosil. In the 2001 Wimbledon Championships, Sprengelmeyer also played in the mixed doubles, partnering Lilia Osterloh. He and partner Kyle Spencer were doubles runners-up at the 2000 Hall of Fame Tennis Championships, an ATP Tour tournament, in Newport.

Sprengelmeyer has three career wins over the Bryan Brothers. The first win was with Adam Peterson at a Challenger event in Texas, and the other two wins were with Mark Merklein in back-to-back finals of Challenger events in California, the Bryan Brother's home state.

ATP career finals

Doubles: 1 (0–1)

Challenger titles

Doubles: (7)

References

1975 births
Living people
American male tennis players
Clemson Tigers men's tennis players
Tennis people from South Carolina